József Kertész (January 28, 1940 – December 11, 2015) was a Hungarian ice hockey player. He played for the Hungary men's national ice hockey team at the 1964 Winter Olympics in Innsbruck.

References

1940 births
2015 deaths
Hungarian ice hockey forwards
Ice hockey players at the 1964 Winter Olympics
Olympic ice hockey players of Hungary